Keita Nakajima (born 24 June 2000) is a Japanese professional golfer. He had an exceptionally successful amateur career and was number 1 in the World Amateur Golf Ranking for a record 87 weeks. He also won the Panasonic Open on the Japan Golf Tour while still an amateur.

Amateur career
Nakajima started playing golf at six and had a successful amateur career, winning the 2018 Australian Amateur and the 2021 Japan Amateur Championship, after finishing runner-up at the event in 2015, 2017 and 2019. He was runner-up at the 2017 Duke of York Young Champions Trophy in England and the 2019 Australian Master of the Amateurs. In 2018, he was runner-up at the Asia-Pacific Amateur Championship, before winning the event in 2021 in a playoff with Hong Kong’s Taichi Kho. Nakajima became the third Japanese champion of the tournament, joining Hideki Matsuyama and Takumi Kanaya. 

He played in a number of representative matches, including the 2017 Nomura Cup, the 2022 Eisenhower Trophy and the 2019 Arnold Palmer Cup, which the international team won 33½–26½ over the American team. Nakajima won both the individual and team gold medals at the at the 2018 Asian Games. He was world ranked number 1 in the World Amateur Golf Ranking for a record 87 weeks between 2020 and 2022, surpassing Jon Rahm's previous record of 60 weeks. He won the Mark H. McCormack Medal for 2021 and 2022, the first two-time recipient.

While still an amateur, Nakajima played in a number of professional tournaments. In 2021, he was runner-up at the Token Homemate Cup, a stroke behind Takumi Kanaya, and won the Panasonic Open in a playoff. After he made the cut at the 2022 Sony Open in Hawaii, he rose to 188th in the Official World Golf Rankings.

Professional career
Nakajima turned professional in the fall of 2022 and made his professional PGA Tour debut at the 2022 Zozo Championship, where he finished T12.

Amateur wins
2016 TrueVisions International Junior Championship, Faldo Series Asia Japan Championship
2017 Kanto Amateur Championship
2018 Australian Amateur, Asian Games (Men's individual)
2021 Japan Amateur Championship, Asia-Pacific Amateur Championship

Source:

Professional wins (1)

Japan Golf Tour wins (1)

Japan Golf Tour playoff record (1–0)

Results in major championships

CUT = missed the halfway cut

Team appearances
Amateur
Nomura Cup (representing Japan): 2017
Junior Golf World Cup (representing Japan): 2018
Arnold Palmer Cup (representing International team): 2019 (winners)
Eisenhower Trophy (representing Japan): 2018, 2022

References

External links

Japanese male golfers
Japan Golf Tour golfers
Asian Games medalists in golf
Asian Games gold medalists for Japan
Medalists at the 2018 Asian Games
Golfers at the 2018 Asian Games
Sportspeople from Saitama Prefecture
2000 births
Living people